Tom or Thomas French may refer to:
 Thomas French, journalist for the St. Petersburg Times
 Thomas French (cricketer) (1821–1909), English cricketer and cleric
 Thomas French (footballer) (1859–1908), played on the winning side in the 1882 FA Cup Final
 Valpy French (Thomas Valpy French: 1825–1891), British bishop and missionary
 Tom French (jockey) (1844–1873), English jockey 
 Tom French (poet), winner of the 2002 Forward Poetry Prize for Best First Collection
 Tom French (politician), former President of the Workers' Party of Ireland
 Tom French (rugby union), currently in the London Wasps squad
 Tom French Cup, awarded by the New Zealand Rugby Union to the Māori player of the year